Coleophora scaleuta is a moth of the family Coleophoridae. It is found in South Africa.

References

Endemic moths of South Africa
scaleuta
Moths of Africa
Moths described in 1911